Municipal election in Ostrava was held as part of Czech municipal elections in 2014. It was a victory of ANO 2011. Tomáš Macura then became new Mayor when he formed coalition with ČSSD and KDU-ČSL.

Results

Aftermath
ANO 2011 originally intended to form coalition with Ostravak and refused to negotiate with ČSSD. ANO negotiated with OStravak, KDU-ČSL and ODS. Negotiations were unsuccessful and  Ostravak agreed to form coalition with ČSSD and KSČM. This coalition broke quickly afterwards giving ANO 2011 new opportunity. Coalition was finally formed between ANO, ČSSD and KDU-ČSL and leader of Ostravan ANO Tomáš Macura became new Mayor.

Coalition ruled Ostrava until December 2015 when ĆSSD and KDU-ČSL left the coalition. ANO 2011 the formed new coalition with ODS and Ostravak.

References

2014
2014 elections in the Czech Republic